Krishna Malla (Nepali: कृष्ण मल्ल)  is a Nepalese film actor, film producer and film director. He is known for Gaajal (2001), Gothalo (1996) and Basudev (1984). His first theater act was Pahad Chichyairahecha.

Biography 
  Royal Nepal Academy 1976–1978 (Sr. Actor – Drama)
  National Theatre 1979–1980
  Shree Samuha 1980 onward.
  Radio Play – Radio Nepal 1978–1982
  Nepal T.V 1984 (Sr. Producer/Director)
  Produced and Directed 1st NTV Telefilm "Prithivi Narayan Shah" 1985.
  Produced/Directed and acted 1st NTV serial, many other Nepali serials
  Docmentary on Indo-Nepal Relation 1987
  Many TV Commercials.
  Produced Filmcity (on NTV)
  Film Artists Association of Nepal 1989 (-Gen Secy)
  Shree Samuha (Artists Group) 1980(-Gen Secy)
  Abhiyan (Soc. org run by Cine artists) 1984
  Abhiyan (social & cultural organization)- Chairperson
  Cine concern( Film prod. House)- Chairperson
  Executive chairman:Film Development Board(Nepal Govt.)
  Chairman:Film Artistes Association of Nepal(imm.past chairman)
  Chairperson : National Film Co-ordination Supreme Com.
  Chairperson : ASA (Project against HIV/AIDS)
  Co-ordinator : Nationwide Dohori Geet Competition (1998)
  President : National Film Artists Association Welfare Com (1998)
  Chairman : 'Visit Nepal 98' Cultural Committee.
  Chairman :New year festival 2062
  Vice-President : Nepal Motion Picture Association Producer Com (1997–98)
  Member : Cine artists relief com. for flood victims (1996)
 Member : Chautara Alumni Association.
 Member : Rotary Club of Bagmati.
 Member : Cine Concern Entertainment Inc( Denver, USA).
 Advisor : International Association of Educators for World Peace. (IAEWP Nepal)
 Advisor : Synergy saving & credit cooperative ltd
 Advisor : Nepal auction service p.ltd

Film

Television

Awards

Social media
 Facebook

References

External links

Youtube
Mero Yueta Sathi Chaa

Living people
People from Sindhupalchowk District
Nepalese male film actors
Nepalese film directors
Nepalese screenwriters
20th-century Nepalese male actors
21st-century Nepalese male actors
Order of Gorkha Dakshina Bahu
Year of birth missing (living people)
Dohori singers
21st-century Nepalese screenwriters
20th-century Nepalese screenwriters
21st-century Nepalese film directors
20th-century Nepalese film directors